Puntala-Rock is a punk rock festival in Lempäälä, Finland and is one of the oldest and largest punk rock festivals in Finland.
It is an important punk-cultural happening in a Finish point of view, because similar punk-rock festivals are not held in Finland. The main organizer is the  Lempäälän karuselli ry (LeKa).

Puntala-Rock history begins in 1980. In 1990s it was quiet, but in 2000, the event returned. The festival will take place in the last weekend of July.
The festival are held on Puntala camp area, located approximately 15 km from the center of Lempäälä to wards Pirkkala.

Puntala-Rock has no age-limit.

External links

 

Punk rock festivals
Rock festivals in Finland
Music festivals in Finland
Music festivals established in 1982
Tourist attractions in Pirkanmaa
1982 establishments in Finland
Summer events in Finland